Woollamia is a beach-side locality in the City of Shoalhaven in New South Wales, Australia. It lies about 18 km southeast of Nowra on the western side of Currambene Creek about six km northwest of Huskisson.

References

City of Shoalhaven